BC Liquor Stores are a chain of crown corporation retail outlets operated by the British Columbia Liquor Distribution Branch to distribute alcoholic beverages in the province of British Columbia, Canada. They are accountable to the Attorney General of British Columbia. BC Liquor Stores currently operate 196 locations across the province. The chain was established in June 1921, following the result of a plebiscite in favour of liquor availability through government liquor stores. Prior to the plebiscite, alcohol had been illegal through the Prohibition Act, introduced on May 23, 1916, with exceptions for sacramental, medicinal or industrial purposes.

History

Prohibition era 
The Prohibition Act was introduced by Conservative Premier William Bowser in May 1916. Its implementation into law was subject to a binding referendum question which took place on September 14, 1916. To the question "Are you in favour of bringing the B.C. Prohibition Act into force?"; 36,490 polled in favour and 27,217 opposed. To accommodate the votes of overseas soldiers, voting continued until December 1916. A royal commission was appointed to analyse the soldiers' votes against double-voting; over half of the soldiers' ballots were disallowed by the commission and prohibition took effect on October 1, 1917, under Harlan Carey Brewster's Liberal government.

On October 20, 1920, a plebiscite was held to end prohibition in favour of government control and moderation. The plebiscite passed in favour of ending prohibition 92,095 to 55,448. As of 1920, British Columbia had been the only province in Canada who had voted in favour of government-controlled liquor sales.

Government Liquor Act 
On February 23, 1921, the Attorney General of British Columbia had introduced the Government Liquor Act. The act was passed in March of that year, and the first government-run liquor stores were opened on June 15, 1921 – the same day the Prohibition Act was repealed. Within the first week of the Government Liquor Act becoming law, 17 stores had been opened; by March 1922 at least one store had been opened in 32 of the 39 provincial electoral districts. The ability to purchase liquor was limited to those who purchased an annual liquor permit for five dollars and who were above 21 years of age.

British Columbians were not able to buy liquor by the glass between 1921 and 1924. A 1925 amendment of the Government Liquor Act allowed for the establishment of beer parlours.

Indian List 
In 1887, British Columbia passed an act titled the Habitual Drunkards Act which restricted the ability of certain individuals to conduct business: any sale or contract involving them was considered void. The individuals encompassed by the act could not legally purchase liquor. Indigenous people were automatically placed on the list, preventing them from being able to purchase alcoholic beverages. This list was referred to as the "Indian List".

Some non-indigenous individuals were also added to the list based on misbehaviour after excessive drinking. In 1963, the Liquor Control Board chairman, Colonel Donald McGugan reported that 4,500–5,000 British Columbians were on the list. Though the members of the list would change, the total number of persons remained approximately the same. The Habitual Drunkards Act was eventually repealed in 1968.

Privatization 
Since 1988, the Government of British Columbia has allowed private retail liquor stores. There was a moratorium in place between 1988 and 2002 which limited the number of new private retail licences that were issued. After the moratorium was lifted, it was observed that between 2002 and 2008 there was a 33% increase in private liquor stores and a 10% decrease in government stores.

Cannabis distribution 
On April 13, 2017, the Canadian government announced their plans to legalize cannabis for recreational use nationwide. The federal government left it up to the individual provinces to regulate the distribution network. The Liquor Control Board of Ontario, the province of Ontario's equivalent, has announced plans to open up 150 additional cannabis-only LCBO stores, 40 of those opening on July 1, 2018.

The previous BC Liberal government had opposed the idea of selling cannabis in liquor stores. A change in government resulted following the 2017 provincial elections, and the Premier of the New Democratic government, John Horgan, has stated he is strongly in favour of using both liquor stores and pharmacies to dispense cannabis. A public consultation process for cannabis legislation in British Columbia was launched on September 25, 2017, and is ongoing.

References 

Alcohol in British Columbia
1921 establishments in British Columbia
Canadian provincial alcohol departments and agencies
Alcohol monopolies
Companies based in Burnaby
Government agencies established in 1921
Crown corporations of British Columbia
Alcohol distribution retailers of Canada
Canadian companies established in 1921